Peter James Peterson (born February 22, 1953) is a Canadian businessman and politician. Peterson was a Member of Parliament for the riding of Hamilton West, representing the Progressive Conservative Party of Canada.

A stockbroker by profession, Peterson was elected in the 1984 Canadian federal election, and served as a backbencher.  He was defeated by Liberal Stan Keyes in the 1988 election.  He challenged Keyes again unsuccessfully in the 1993 election.

Electoral record

External links
 

1953 births
Businesspeople from Ontario
Canadian stockbrokers
Living people
Members of the House of Commons of Canada from Ontario
Politicians from Hamilton, Ontario
Progressive Conservative Party of Canada MPs